Kathala railway station 
() is  located in town of Kathala Chenab,  Pakistan.

See also
 List of railway stations in Pakistan
 Pakistan Railways

References

External links

Railway stations in Gujrat District